Quentin Ferreira (born 28 December 1972) is a former South African cricketer.  Ferreira was a right-handed batsman who bowled right-arm fast-medium.  He was born in East London, Cape Province.

In a professional career that lasted from the 1996/97 to the 1998/99 South African cricket seasons, Ferreira played both the first-class and List A formats of the game with four different sides.  Debuting in the 1996/97 season for Eastern Province, he proceeded to play first-class and List A cricket for Eastern Province B, Northerns B and Northerns.  He later played List A cricket in England for the Surrey Cricket Board in 1999, making two appearances in the 1999 NatWest Trophy against Norfolk in the 1st round and Cheshire in the 2nd round.

In his first-class career, he played 18 times scoring 374 runs at a batting average of 23/37, with a single half century high score of 63*.  A bowling all rounder, Ferreira took 57 wickets at a bowling average of 24.38, with best figures of 4/17.  Ferreira played nearly an equal amount of List A matches, playing 22.  In these he scored 128 runs at an average of 21.33, with a high score of 34*.  With the ball he took 26 wickets at an average 30.88, with best figures of 3/40.  In the field he took 5 catches.

His older brother, Dean, represented Orange Free State at first-class and List A level.

References

External links
Quentin Ferreira at ESPNcricinfo
Quentin Ferreira at CricketArchive

1972 births
Living people
Cricketers from East London, Eastern Cape
South African people of Portuguese descent
South African cricketers
Eastern Province cricketers
Northerns cricketers
Surrey Cricket Board cricketers